Riversdale railway station is located on the Alamein line in Victoria, Australia. It serves the eastern Melbourne suburb of Camberwell, and it opened on 30 May 1890.

A number of services terminate at Riversdale after morning and evening peaks and return to Camberwell for stabling.

History

Riversdale station opened on 30 May 1890, along with the first section of the Outer Circle line. Prior to opening, it was provisionally called Prospect Hill, however, it has been named Riversdale since it opened. The name derives from the nearby Riversdale Road, itself named by parliamentarian and local resident Matthew O'Grady. O'Grady named it after the fact that the road leads to the valley of the Yarra River.

Though it was closed for a year in 1897 and 1898, when the Outer Circle line closed, it reopened soon after due to a public outcry.

In 1915, the current Down platform (Platform 2) was provided, as well as two goods sidings. In 1922, a siding for Camberwell Council was provided.

By 1948, the council siding was removed and, by 1953, all remaining sidings were abolished. On 31 July 1955, the line was duplicated to Hartwell and, on 29 November 1959, the line was duplicated to Camberwell. The duplication to Camberwell included a flyover for the Down line, which crosses over the Belgrave and Lilydale lines. Also in that year, boom barriers replaced hand gates at the Prospect Hill Road level crossing, located nearby in the Up direction of the station.

The level crossing at Riversdale Road, located at the Down end of the station, features unusual manually-operated boom barriers, which are controlled by a signal box. The boom barrier arms are divided into two sections, so as not to make contact with overhead tram wires. These boom barriers were provided in 1963, and replaced interlocked gates.

In 1972, both platforms were extended at the Up end.

Platforms and services

Riversdale has two side platforms. It is serviced by Metro Trains' Alamein line services.

Platform 1:
  weekday all stations and limited express services to Flinders Street; all stations shuttle services to Camberwell

Platform 2:
  all stations services to Alamein; terminating services

Transport links

CDC Melbourne operates one route via Riversdale station, under contract to Public Transport Victoria:
 : Box Hill station – Chadstone Shopping Centre

Yarra Trams operates one route via Riversdale station:
 : Docklands (Waterfront City) – Wattle Park

References

External links

 Melway map at street-directory.com.au

Railway stations in Australia opened in 1890
Railway stations in Melbourne
Railway stations in the City of Boroondara